The 1959 South Australian National Football League season was the 80th season of the top-level Australian rules football competition in South Australia.

By winning the 1959 SANFL Grand Final, Port Adelaide set the Australian record of six consecutive Grand Final victories in a top level state competition when it defeated West Adelaide by 10 points.

Ladder

Finals Series

Grand Final

References 

South Australian National Football League seasons
SANFL